The 1997 Big 12 Conference women's basketball tournament was held March 4–8, 1997, at Municipal Auditorium in Kansas City, MO.

Number 3 seed  defeated number 5 seed  54–44 to win their first championship and receive the conference's automatic bid to the 1997 NCAA tournament.

Seeding
The Tournament consisted of a 12 team single-elimination tournament with the top 4 seeds receiving a bye.

Schedule

Tournament

All-Tournament team
Most Outstanding Player – Andria Jones, Kansas State

See also
1997 Big 12 Conference men's basketball tournament
1997 NCAA Division I women's basketball tournament
1996–97 NCAA Division I women's basketball rankings

References

Big 12 Conference women's basketball tournament
Tournament
Big 12 Conference women's basketball tournament
Big 12 Conference women's basketball tournament